Borja Casillas Toledo, known professionally as Drag Sethlas, is a Spanish drag performer known for competing on season 2 of Drag Race España, as well as winning the Drag Queen Gala of the Carnival of Las Palmas in 2017 and 2020.

Early life and education 
Borja Casillas Toledo attended the University of Las Palmas de Gran Canaria, where he received a degree in Early Childhood Education. He has been a dancer since a very young age.

Career 
In 2017, Casillas Toledo won the twentieth edition of the Drag Queen Gala of the Carnival of Las Palmas de Canaria, with the concept "Mi cielo!, yo no hago milagros, que sea lo que Dios quiera", designed by Nelson Rodríguez. In 2020, he returned to win the twenty-third edition of said gala.

In 2022, he participated in Drag Race España season 2, where he ultimately placed 6th.

References

Living people
Drag Race España contestants
Spanish drag queens
Year of birth missing (living people)
University of Las Palmas de Gran Canaria alumni